The 1975 Charlotte Tennis Classic, also known by its sponsored name North Carolina National Bank Tennis Classic,  was a men's tennis tournament played on outdoor clay courts that was part of the World Championship Tennis (WCT) circuit. It was the fifth edition of the tournament and was held from April 21 through April 27, 1975 at the Julian J. Clark Tennis Stadium, owned by the Olde Providence Racquet Club in Charlotte, North Carolina in the United States. Third-seeded Raúl Ramírez won the singles title.

Finals

Singles
 Raúl Ramírez defeated  Roscoe Tanner 3–6, 6–4, 6–3
 It was Ramírez' 2nd singles title of the year and the 5th of his career.

Doubles
 Patricio Cornejo /  Jaime Fillol defeated  Ismail El Shafei /  Brian Fairlie 6–3, 5–7, 6–4

References

External links
 ITF tournament edition details

Charlotte Tennis Classic
Charlotte Tennis Classic
Charlotte Tennis Classic
Charlotte Tennis Classic